Bordesholm is an Amt ("collective municipality") in the district of Rendsburg-Eckernförde, in Schleswig-Holstein, Germany. It is situated around the village Bordesholm, which is the seat of the Amt. It was called Bordesholm-Land until 30 June 2007.

Subdivision
The Amt Bordesholm consists of the following municipalities:

Bissee 
Bordesholm from 1 Jul 2007
Brügge 
Grevenkrug 
Groß Buchwald 
Hoffeld 
Loop 
Mühbrook 
Negenharrie 
Reesdorf 
Schmalstede 
Schönbek 
Sören 
Wattenbek

References 

Ämter in Schleswig-Holstein